Taxation of costs is a ministerial function performed by a court upon the resolution of case. It involves entering the various costs and their amounts against the party (either the claimant or defendant) against whom those costs have been awarded by the court. The itemisation of costs or the subsequent determination of the costs that should be allowed is not a determination of the outcome of the litigation.

This is now known as detailed assessment in English law following the Civil Procedure Act 1997.

In early common law costs were unknown, but as early as 1278 an English statute was passed whereby costs could be awarded to the prevailing party (Brown v. Consolidated Fisheries Co., 18 F.R.D. 433).

Such costs can include items such as witness fees, mileage and subsistence, marshal's fees, attorney's and other docket fees, and a reporter's charge for transcript. 

Civil procedure
Legal costs